Raymond Murray Schafer  (18 July 1933 – 14 August 2021) was a Canadian composer, writer, music educator, and environmentalist perhaps best known for his World Soundscape Project, concern for acoustic ecology, and his book The Tuning of the World (1977). He was the first recipient of the Jules Léger Prize in 1978.

Biography

Born in Sarnia, Ontario, he studied at the Royal Schools of Music in London, the Royal Conservatory of Music (in Toronto), and the University of Toronto. At the last institution he was a pupil of Richard Johnston.

His music education theories are followed around the world. He started soundscape studies at Simon Fraser University in the 1960s.

In addition to introducing the concept of soundscape, he also coined the term schizophonia in 1969, the splitting of a sound from its source or the condition caused by this split: "We have split the sound from the maker of the sound. Sounds have been torn from their natural sockets and given an amplified and independent existence. Vocal sound, for instance, is no longer tied to a hole in the head but is free to issue from anywhere in the landscape." Steven Feld, borrowing a term from Gregory Bateson, calls the recombination and recontextualization of sounds split from their sources schismogenesis.

In 1987 Schafer was awarded the first Glenn Gould Prize in recognition of his contributions. He has also won two JUNO Awards for Classical Composition of the Year: in 2004 for his "String Quartet No. 8", and in 2011 for his "Duo for Violin and Piano".

In 2003 Schafer was the artistic director of Coimbra Vibra!, an event that celebrated music and the acoustic environment, gathering 1200 musicians and over 10000 spectators in the city of Coimbra (Portugal).
In 2005 Schafer was keynote speaker at the 12th International Congress on Sound and Vibration. His presentation was titled "I have never seen a sound." In 2005 Schafer was awarded the Walter Carsen Prize, by the Canada Council for the Arts, one of the top honours for lifetime achievement by a Canadian artist. In 2009, Schafer received the Governor General's Performing Arts Award for Lifetime Artistic Achievement, Canada's highest honour in the performing arts. In 2013, he was made a Companion of the Order of Canada "for his contributions as an internationally renowned composer of contemporary music, and for his groundbreaking work in acoustic ecology".

Schafer was a practitioner of graphic notation. He died at his home near Peterborough, Ontario, of complications of Alzheimer's disease on 14 August 2021.

Starting in 2010 a World Listening Day organised by the World Listening Project has taken place annually on 18 July, with the date chosen in honour of Schafer's birthday.

Selected works

Compositions
 Stage works
 Job (Schafer et al., after the Biblical book of Job). 2011 (Kingston, Ont 2011). Chor (SATB), actors, et cetra. (Premieres 14, 15 May at 8:00 pm EST at Sydenham Street United Church, Kingston, Ontario.)
 Jonah (Schafer et al., after the Biblical book of Jonah). 1979 (Maynooth, Ont 1979). Chor (SATB), actors, fl, clarinet, organ, percussion. Arcana 1980
 Patria (1966—)
 Patria: The Prologue, The Princess of the Stars
 Patria 1: Wolfman
 Patria 2: Requiems for the Party Girl
 Patria 3: The Greatest Show
 Adapted into the film Carnival of Shadows
 Patria 4: The Black Theatre of Hermes Trismegistos
 Patria 5: The Crown of Ariadne
 Patria 6: Ra
 Patria 7: Asterion
 Patria 8: The Palace of the Cinnabar Phoenix
 Patria 9: The Enchanted Forest
 Patria 10: The Spirit Garden
 Patria: The Epilogue: And Wolf Shall Inherit the Moon
 Orchestra
 In Memoriam: Alberto Guerrero. 1959 (Vancouver 1962). Str orch. Arcana 1985. Centrediscs CMC-2887 (Vancouver Symphony Orchestra)
 Partita for String Orchestra. 1961 (Hal 1963). Arcana. CBC SM-15 (CBC Vancouver Orchestra)
 Canzoni for Prisoners. 1962 (Montreal 1963). Full orch. Ber 1977
 Untitled Composition for Orchestra No.1. 1963 (Toronto 1966). Sm orch. Ber 1977
 Untitled Composition for Orchestra No. 2. 1963. Full orch. Ber 1977
 Statement in Blue. 1964 (Toronto 1965). Youth orch. BMIC 1966, UE 1971. 1970. Mel SMLP-4017 (Lawrence Park Collegiate O, J. McDougall conductor)
 Son of Heldenleben. 1968 (Montreal 1968). Full orch, tape. UE 1976. RCI 387/Sel CC-15-101/5-ACM 3 (MSO)
 No Longer than Ten (10) Minutes. 1970. Rev 1972 (Toronto 1971). Full orch. Ber 1977
 East (meditations on a text from Ishna Upanishad). 1972 (Bath, England, 1973). Sm orch. UE 1977. RCI 434/5-ACM 3 (NACO)
 North/White. 1973 (Vancouver 1973). Full orch, snowmobile. UE 1980
 Train. 1976 (Toronto 1976). Youth orch. Ber 1977
 Cortège. 1977(Ott 1977). Sm orch. UE 1981
 Ko wo kiku ('Listen to the Incense'). 1985 (Kyoto 1985). Full orch. Arcana 1989
 Dream Rainbow Dream Thunder. 1986 (Kingston 1986). Full orch. Arcana 1989. CBC SMCD-5101 (Esprit Orchestra)
 Scorpius. 1990 (Toronto 1990). Orch. Arcana 1990
 Soloists and/or Choir with Orchestra
 Minnelieder (various Medieval German poets). 1956 (chamber version), 1987 (orch version) (Quebec City 1987 orch version). Mezzo, woodwind quintet or mezzo, orch. Ber 1970 (chamber version), Arcana (rental, orch version, with one additional song 'Über den Linden,' text by Walter von der Vogelweider). (chamber version) RCI 218/RCA CCS-1012/5-ACM 3
 Protest and Incarceration (East European poets). 1960 (Toronto 1967). Mezzo, orch. Ms
 Brébeuf, cantata (Brébeuf, transl Schafer). 1961 (Toronto 1966). Bar, orch. Arcana 1981
 Threnody (Japanese children). 1966, rev 1967 (Vancouver 1967). Choir, orch, tape. Ber 1970. 1970. Mel SMLP-4017 (Lawrence Park Collegiate O and Choir, J. Barron conductor)
 Lustro. 1970-2 (CBC Toronto 1973). Comprising:
 Part 1: Divan i Shams i Tabriz (Jalal al din Rumi). 1969, rev 1970. 6 solo voices, orch, tape. UE 1977
 Part 2: Music for the Morning of the World (various). 1970. V, 4-track tape. UE 1973. 2-Mel SMLP-4035-6 (K. Terrell)
 Part 3: Beyond the Great Gate of Light (Tagore). 1972. 6 solo voices, orch, tape. UE 1977
 Arcana (Schafer, transl into Middle Egyptian hieroglyphs by D.B. Redford) 12 of the 14 songs (all but no. 9 and 12) appear in Patria 4. 1972 (Montreal 1973 orch version). V, orch (voice, chamber ensemble). Ms. UE 1977 (chamber version). RCI 434/5-ACM 3 (Morrison)
 Adieu Robert Schumann (Clara Schumann, adapt Schafer). 1976. Alto, orch. UE 1980. CBC SM-364 (Forrester)
 Hymn to Night (Novalis) from Patria 7. 1976. Sop, small orch, tape. UE 1981. CBC SM-364 (Turofsky, CBC Vancouver Orchestra)
 The Garden of the Heart (The Thousand and One Nights). 1980 (Ottawa 1981). Alto, full orch. Arcana 1982
 Concerto for Flute. 1984 (Montreal 1984). Fl, full orch. Arcana 1985
 Letters from Mignon. 1987 (Calgary 1987). Mezzo, orch. Arcana 1989
 Concerto for Harp. 1987 (Toronto 1988). Hp, full orch, tape. Arcana 1988
 Concerto for Guitar. 1989 (Toronto 1990). Guit, small orch. Arcana 1989
 The Darkly Splendid Earth: The Lonely Traveller. 1991 (Toronto 1991). Vn, full orch. Arcana
 Gitanjali (Rabindranath Tagore). 1991 (Ott 1992). Sop, small orch. Arcana 1990
 Accordion Concerto. 1993. Accordion, orch
 Concerto for Viola and Orchestra. 1997. Viola, orch
 The Falcon's Trumpet (Concerto for Trumpet and Orchestra), 1996. Arcana.
 Chamber
 Concerto for Harpsichord and Eight Wind Instruments. 1954 (Montreal 1959). Arcana 1990. RCI 193 (K. Jones harpsichord)/Centrediscs CMC-CD-3488 (Tilney harpsichord)
 Sonatina for Flute and Harpsichord (or Piano) 1958. Ber 1976
 Five Studies on Texts by Prudentius. 1962. Sop, 4 fl. BMIC 1965
 4 arias from Loving: The Geography of Eros (1963), and Air Ishtar, Modesty, Vanity (all 1965). Sop, chamber ensemble (Modesty), mezzo, chamber ensemble (Ishtar, Vanity, and Eros). Ber 1979
 Requiems for the Party Girl (Schafer) from Patria 2. 1966. Mezzo, chamber ensemble. BMIC 1967. RCI 299/5-ACM 3 (Mailing mezzo, SMCQ)/Mel SMLP-4026 (Mailing, instr ensemble, Schafer conductor)/CRI SD-245 (Pilgrim soprano, Chicago U Contemporary Chamb Players, Shapey conductor)
 Minimusic. 1967. Any comb of instr or voice. UE 1971, Ber 1972
 String Quartet No. 1. 1970. UE 1973. RCI 353/Mel SMLP-4026 (Purcell String Quartet)/Concert Hall SMS-2902/Mel SMLP-4038/2-Centrediscs CMC-CD-39-4090 (Orford String Quartet)
 Enchantress (Sappho). 1971. V, exotic fl, 8 violoncello. Ber 1978
 String Quartet No. 2 ('Waves'). 1976. Ber 1978. Mel SMLP-4038/2-Centrediscs CMC-CD-39-4090 (Orford String Quartet)/RCI 476/5-ACM 3 (Purcell String Quartet)
 The Crown of Ariadne, from Patria 3 and Patria 5. Ca 1979. Hp, percussion (by the harpist). Arcana 1980. Aquitaine MS-90570/Centrediscs CMC-CD-41-4292 (Loman)/Mark MC-20485 (Mario Falcao)
 Music for Wilderness Lake. 1979. 12 trombone, small rural lake. Arcana 1981
 Beauty and the Beast (Schafer, after de Beaumont) from Patria 3. 1979. Alto with masks, string quartet. Arcana 1983 (Eng text and French transl)
 Wizard Oil and Indian Sagwa (Schafer) from Patria 3. 1980. Speaker, clarinet. Arcana 1982
 String Quartet No. 3. 1981. Arcana 1983. 2-Centrediscs CMC-CD 39-4090 (Orford String Quartet)
 Theseus. 1983. Hp, string quartet. Arcana 1988. Centrediscs CMC-CD-41-4292 (Loman)
 Buskers (formerly Rounds), from Patria 3. 1985. Fl, violin, viola. Arcana
 Le Cri de Merlin. 1987. Guit, tape. Arcana 1987. Chandos ABTD-1419/Chandos CHAN-8784 (CD) (Kraft)
 String Quartet No. 4. 1989. Str quartet, soprano. Arcana 1989. 2-Centrediscs CMC-CD-39-4090 (Orford String Quartet, Wendy Humphreys)
 String Quartet No. 5 ('Rosalind'). 1989. Arcana 1989. 2-Centrediscs CMC-CD-39-4090 (Orford String Quartet)
 String Quartet No. 6 ('Parting Wild Horse's Mane'). 1993
 String Quartet No. 7. Soprano and percussion. 1998
 Four-Forty. String quartet, orch. 2000
 String Quartet No. 8. Tape. 2001
 String Quartet No. 9. 2005
 String Quartet No. 10. 2005
 String Quartet No. 11. 2006
 Symphony No. 1 in C Minor
 String Quartet No. 12. 2012
 String Quartet No. 13. 2015
 Choir
 Four Songs on Texts of Tagore. 1962. Sop, mezzo, alto, SA. Ms
 Gita (Bhagavad Gita), from Patria 1. 1967. SATB, brass, tape. UE 1977
 Epitaph for Moonlight (invented words by Grade 7 students), from Patria 5. 1968. SATB, bells (optional). BMIC 1969, UE 1971. CBC SM-274/5-ACM 3 (Festival Singers)/Mel SMLP-4017 (Lawrence Park Collegiate Choir, J. Barron conductor)/Grouse GR-101-C (cass) (Vancouver Chamber Choir)/P3-C (cass) (Powell River Academy Singers, Don James dir)/World WRC-257 (University of Alberta Concert Choir, Larry Cook conductor)
 From the Tibetan Book of the Dead (Bardo Thödol) from Patria 2. 1968. Sop, SATB, alto fl, clarinet, tape. UE 1973
 Two Anthems (formerly Yeow and Pax ) (Isaiah). 1969. SATB, organ, tape. Ber 1980
 In Search of Zoroaster (Sacred Books of the East). 1971. Male voice, SATB (at least 150 voices), percussion, organ (tape). Ber 1976
 Miniwanka or the Moments of Water (North American Indian dialects). 1971. SA (SATB). UE 1973. RCI 434 (Vancouver Bach Choir)/Grouse GR-101-C (cass) (Vancouver Chamber Choir)/ARU 8701-CD (F.A.C.E. Senior Treble Choir, Iwan Edwards, dir)/Centrediscs CMC-2285 (Toronto Children's Chor)/Imperial unnumbered (Powell River Boys' Choir, James dir)
 Psalm (formerly Tehillah), from Apocalypsis (Psalm 148). 1972, rev 1976. Mixed chorus, percussion. Ber 1976. RCI 434 (Vancouver Bach Choir)
 Credo (Giordano Bruno, adpt by Schafer), from Apocalypsis. 1977. 12 choirs, tape, optional string and/or synthesizer. Arcana 1986
 Felix's Girls (Henry Felix) from Patria 3. 1979. SATB quartet or choir. Arcana 1980. Grouse GR-101-C (cass) (Vancouver Chamber Choir)
 Gamelan (Balinese solmization syllables), from Patria 3. 1979. Quar or choir (SATB, SASA, TBTB). Arcana 1980. Grouse GR-100/Marquis MAR-106/Grouse 101-C (cass) (Vancouver Chamber Choir)
 Sun (words for sun in 36 languages) from Princess of the Stars (Patria prologue). 1982. SATB. Arcana 1983. 2-Centrediscs CMC-14-1584/RCI 585 (Elmer Iseler Singers)/Grouse GR-101-C (cass) (Vancouver Chamber Choir)
 A Garden of Bells (Schafer et al.). 1983. SATB. Arcana 1984. Grouse GR-101-C (cass) (Vancouver Chamber Choir)
 Snowforms (Inuit words for 'snow'). 1981, rev 1983. SA. Arcana 1986. Grouse GR-101-C (cass) (Vancouver Chamber Choir)
 The Star Princess and the Waterlilies (Schafer), from And Wolf Shall Inherit the Moon (Patria conclusion). 1984. Narr, children's chorus, light percussion. Arcana 1984. TCC TCC-D-004 (Toronto Children's Chor)
 Fire (Schafer) from Patria 5. 1986. SATB, light percussion. Arcana 1986. Grouse GR-101-C (cass) (Vancouver Chamb Choir)
 Magic Songs (Schafer). 1988. SATB (TTBB). Arcana 1988
 The Death of the Buddha (Mahaperinibbana Sutta). 1989. Mixed chorus, gongs, bell tree. Arcana 1989
 Vox Naturae, from De Rerum Natura. 1997
 Apocalypsis, revised version 2015, Toronto Luminato Festival, June. Multiple choirs, dancers, actors, throat singer
 Voice
 Three Contemporaries (Schafer). 1956. Mezzo, piano. Ber 1974
 Kinderlieder (traditional, Brecht). 1958. Sop, piano. Ber 1975. CBC SM-141 (Mailing mezzo)
 La Testa d'Adriane (Schafer), from Patria 3. 1977. Sop, accordion. Arcana 1980/in R. Murray Schafer: A Collection. Mel SMLP-4034 (Morrison soprano)
 Sun Father Sky Mother (Schafer) from And Wolf Shall Inherit the Moon (Patria conclusion). 1985. Solo voice in a mountain setting, near water and forest. Musical Canada
 Tantrika (Sanskrit words from Tantric texts), from Patria 3. 1986. Mezzo, 4 percussion. 1986
 Gitanjali (Rabindranath Tagore). 1991. Soprano, orch
 Other
 Kaleidoscope. 1967. Multi-track tape
 Okeanos (Hesiod, Homer, Melville, Pound, et al.). 1971. 4-track tape (composed with Bruce Davis, text compiled with Brian Fawcett)
 Dream Passage (Schafer). 1969 (CBC radio 1969). Radio version of Patria 2: Requiems for the Party Girl. Mezzo, chamber ensemble, tape
 Hear Me Out (Schafer) from Patria 3. 1979. 4 speaking voices. Arcana 1980
 One movement for Ontario Variations. 1979. Pf, variations by Ontario composers, on a theme by Jack Behrens
 Harbour Symphony. 1983. Fog horns. Ms. Portion of score printed in Musicworks 25, Summer 1983
 Also a work for piano solo, Polytonality (1954,. Ber 1974), and several works in all categories, now withdrawn by the composer
 Wolf Music (2003)

Written works
 Ezra Pound and Music (1961)
 The Composer in the Classroom (1965)
 Ear cleaning: Notes for an experimental music course (1967)  – included in The Thinking Ear
 The New Soundscape (1968)
 The Book of Noise (1970)
 When Words Sing (1970)
 The Rhinoceros in the Classroom (1975)
 E.T.A. Hoffmann and Music (1975) 
 Creative Music Education: A Handbook for the Modern Music Teacher (1976) 
 Smoke : A Novel (1976) – reprinted as Ariadne (1985)
 The Tuning of the World (The Soundscape) (1977) , republished as The Soundscape (1994) 
 Five Village Soundscapes (1977) – editor
 Music in the Cold (1977)
 The Chaldean Inscription (1978)
 R. Murray Schafer: A Collection (1979)
 The Sixteen Scribes (1981)
 On Canadian Music (1984)
 Dicamus et Labyrinthos: A Philologist's Notebook (1984)
 The Thinking Ear: On Music Education (1986) 
 Patria and the Theatre of Confluence (1991) 
 A Sound Education: 100 Exercises in Listening and Soundmaking (1992)
 Voices of Tyranny: Temples of Silence: Studies and Reflections on the Contemporary Soundscape (1993)
 Wolf Tracks (1997)
 Patria: The Complete Cycle (2002)
 Shadowgraphs and Legends (2004)
 The Enchanted Forest (2005) book & CD
 HearSing (2005)
 A Little Sound Education (2009, together with Tadahiko Imada 今田匡彦, Shunjusha　春秋社，Tokyo)

See also
 Sound culture
 Sound map

References

Further reading
 Eatock, Colin. "R. Murray Schafer at 75: an appreciation," in Queen's Quarterly. Kingston, Ontario: Queen's University Press, Spring 2009, pp. 98–115.
 Steenhuisen, Paul.  "Interview with R. Murray Schafer".  In Sonic Mosaics: Conversations with Composers.  Edmonton:  University of Alberta Press, 2009.  
 Wilkins, Nigel, Musical Encounters, London, Austin Macaulay, 2018.
 Scott, L. Brett, R. Murray Schafer: a creative life, Lanham, Maryland, Rowman & Littlefield Publishers, 2019.

External links
 Arcana Editions bibliography
 R. Murray Schafer at the Canadian Encyclopedia
 R. Murray Schafer biography at the Canadian Music Center
 R. Murray Schafer at the Living Composers Project
 Music Behind Walls, 3:24 min, R. Murray Schafer (RealMedia)
 World Soundscape Project
 Listen, a short film on Schafer – Governor General's Performing Arts Award for Lifetime Artistic Achievement
 R. Murray Schafer – National Arts Center resoures
 Leonardo Acoustic Ecology and the Soundscape Bibliography by Maksymilian Kapelański with special section on R. Murray Schafer
 
 

1933 births
2021 deaths
20th-century classical composers
20th-century Canadian composers
20th-century Canadian male musicians
21st-century classical composers
21st-century Canadian composers
21st-century Canadian male musicians
Canadian classical composers
Canadian male classical composers
Canadian opera composers
Canadian people of German descent
Canadian people of Scottish descent
Male opera composers
Non-fiction environmental writers
People from Sarnia
Companions of the Order of Canada
Glenn Gould Prize winners
Governor General's Performing Arts Award winners
Jules Léger Prize for New Chamber Music winners
Juno Award for Classical Album of the Year – Solo or Chamber Ensemble winners
Juno Award for Classical Composition of the Year winners
Fellows of the Royal Conservatory of Music
The Royal Conservatory of Music alumni